Petrinum may refer to:

Religion
Munus petrinum, the concept of the Primacy of the Roman Pontiff in the Church of Christ

History
 The ancient village Petrinum on the site of the contemporary town of Mondragone, Italy

Educational institutions
Bischöfliches Gymnasium Petrinum, a private school established in 1896 in Linz, Austria
Gymnasium Petrinum Brilon, a state funded school established in 1655 in Brilon, Germany
Gymnasium Petrinum Dorsten, a state-funded school established in 1642 in Dorsten, Germany
Gymnasium Petrinum Recklinghausen, a state-funded school established in 1421 in Recklinghausen, Germany